Shoma Sato may refer to:
 Shoma Sato (baseball, born 1989)
 Shoma Sato (baseball, born 1998)
 Shoma Sato (swimmer)